Annecy Cathedral (French: Cathédrale Saint-Pierre d'Annecy) is a Roman Catholic church located in Annecy, France. The cathedral is a national monument.

The church was erected at the beginning of the 16th century by Jacques Rossel as a chapel for a Franciscan priory. During the French Revolution, the building was used as a temple of the Goddess Reason. It was raised to the status of a cathedral in 1822, when the Diocese of Annecy was established from the Diocese of Chambéry.

The organ of the cathedral was built by Nicolas-Antoine Lété, an organ builder of the French king, in 1840–1842.

External links

Location

References

Annecy
Cathedral
Churches in Haute-Savoie